The Cornish Art Colony (or Cornish Artists’ Colony, or Cornish Colony) was a popular art colony centered in Cornish, New Hampshire from about 1895 through the years of World War I.  Attracted by the natural beauty of the area, about 100 artists, sculptors, writers, designers, and politicians lived there either full-time or during the summer months.  With views across the Connecticut River Valley to Mount Ascutney in Vermont, the bucolic scenery was considered to resemble that of an Italian landscape.

The central figure of the Cornish Colony was Augustus Saint-Gaudens.  Beginning around 1885, Augustus attracted a summer colony of artists that grew into a single extended social network.  Some were related, some were friends, some were promising students from the Art Students League of New York that Saint-Gaudens had co-founded, and some were Saint-Gaudens' assistants who developed significant careers of their own.

After his death in 1907 it slowly dissipated. His house and gardens are now preserved as Saint-Gaudens National Historic Site.

Though the colony's name referred to its social center in the village of Cornish, geographically it was spread out over the villages of Windsor, Vermont and Plainfield, New Hampshire as well. Windsor was the mailing address for the entire area and the arrival point of most of the colonists, who usually came from New York City by train.

People associated with the Cornish Colony 

The following people are known to have been part of the colony:

 Adeline Pond Adams, poet and art historian
 Herbert Adams, sculptor
 Ethel Barrymore, actress
 George de Forest Brush, painter
 Witter Bynner, poet
 Winston Churchill, American novelist 
 Kenyon Cox, painter and muralist 
 Thomas Dewing, painter
 Marie Dressler, actress
 Isadora Duncan, dancer
 Arthur Farwell, composer
 Barry Faulkner, muralist and mosaicist
 Daniel Chester French, sculptor
 Henry Brown Fuller, painter
 Lucia Fairchild Fuller, painter
 Learned Hand, judge
 Percy MacKaye, dramatist
 Paul Manship, sculptor 
 Rose Standish Nichols, garden designer, writer, and activist
 Maxfield Parrish, painter and muralist 
 Stephen Parrish, painter and etcher
 Maxwell Perkins, editor
 Charles A. Platt, architect and garden designer
 Frederic Remington, painter, sculptor and author
 Augustus Saint-Gaudens, sculptor
 Louis St. Gaudens, sculptor and Augustus Saint-Gaudens' brother 
 Everett Shinn, painter and illustrator
 Florence Scovel Shinn, illustrator and writer
 Ellen Biddle Shipman, landscape architect
 Bessie Potter Vonnoh, sculptor
 Robert Vonnoh, painter
 Woodrow Wilson, American president
 William Zorach, sculptor
 Willard Metcalf, painter
 Witter Bynner, poet

See also
 New Hampshire Historical Marker No. 134: The Cornish Colony

References

External links
AskART: Cornish Colony
Cornish Colony Museum archive copy of website
Augustus Saint-Gaudens, Master Sculptor, exhibition catalog fully online as PDF from The Metropolitan Museum of Art

American artist groups and collectives
Art in New Hampshire
Sullivan County, New Hampshire
Cornish, New Hampshire